The Mather House Museum in Port Jefferson, New York is local history museum complex that includes:
 the mid 19th century period Mather House house with furnished rooms, and local history and decorative art exhibits
 a craft house with a display of toys, spinning wheels and quilts
 a country store with items from a historic barber shop, general store and butcher shop
 a barn with shipbuilding and sailmaking artifacts
 a tool shed with shipbuilding and carpentry tools
 and a museum with antique clocks.

The house is the headquarters location for The Historical Society of Greater Port Jefferson. The house is located at 115 Prospect Street in Port Jefferson.

References

External links
 Mather House Museum - Port Jefferson Historical Society

Historic house museums in New York (state)
Museums in Suffolk County, New York
History museums in New York (state)
Port Jefferson, New York
Historical society museums in New York (state)
Houses in Suffolk County, New York
Open-air museums in New York (state)